Dagui Orphie Bakari (born 6 September 1974) is a retired Ivorian football striker. 

In 2004 he had a trial at Premier League club Tottenham Hotspur, however a permanent deal never materialised.

References

External links
 

1974 births
Living people
Footballers from Paris
Citizens of Ivory Coast through descent
Ivorian footballers
Association football forwards
Ivory Coast international footballers
French footballers
Amiens SC players
Le Mans FC players
Lille OSC players
RC Lens players
AS Nancy Lorraine players
Ligue 1 players
Olympique Noisy-le-Sec players
French sportspeople of Ivorian descent